An apostolic vicariate is a territorial jurisdiction of the Catholic Church under a titular bishop centered in missionary regions and countries where dioceses or parishes have not yet been established. It is essentially provisional, though it may last for a century or more. The hope is that the region will generate sufficient numbers of Catholics for the Church to create a diocese. In turn, the status of apostolic vicariate is often a promotion for a former apostolic prefecture, while either may have started out as a mission sui iuris.

It is exempt, directly subject to the missionary Congregation for the Evangelization of Peoples of the Vatican in Rome. Like the stage of apostolic prefecture which often precedes it, the vicariate is not part of an ecclesiastical province. It is intended to mature in developing Catholic members until it can be promoted to a (usually suffragan) diocese. 

The Eastern Catholic counterpart is an (apostolic, patriarchal, or archiepiscopal) exarchate.

Institution
An apostolic vicariate is led by a vicar apostolic, who is usually a titular bishop. While such a territory can be classed as a particular Church, according to canon 371.1 of the Latin Code of Canon Law, a vicar apostolic's jurisdiction is an exercise of the jurisdiction of the Pope — the territory comes directly under the pope as "universal bishop", and the pope exercises this authority through a "vicar". 
This is unlike the jurisdiction of a diocesan bishop, whose jurisdiction derives directly from his office.

Like any ecclesiastical jurisdiction, an apostolic vicariate may be administered by the bishop of a neighbouring diocese, or by a priest appointed transitionally as an apostolic administrator. As in a regular diocese, the vicar apostolic may appoint priests as vicars exercising limited jurisdiction over the apostolic vicariate. Normally, a titular bishop is appointed to administer the apostolic vicariate. When someone who does not qualify or has not been ordained as bishop is appointed ad interim, he may be styled Pro-vicar.

An apostolic vicariate is to be distinguished from an apostolic prefecture, a similar type of territory whose chief distinction from an apostolic vicariate is that its prefect is not a titular bishop, but a priest. The prefecture is not considered organised enough to be elevated to apostolic vicariate. The less developed instance is the mission sui iuris, which other than the ones mentioned before is not a particular church, although it shares some similarities to one; at its head, an ecclesiastical superior is named. The usual sequence of development is mission, apostolic prefecture, apostolic vicariate, and finally diocese (or even archdiocese). See also apostolic exarch for an Eastern Catholic counterpart.

The apostolic vicariate is distinguished from a territorial abbacy (or "abbey nullius") — an area not a diocese but under the direction of the abbot of a monastery.

Starting in 2019, new Vicars Apostolic, although they are (or become) bishops, are no longer assigned titular sees.

List

Current apostolic vicariates

Africa
 Apostolic Vicariate of Alexandria of Egypt
 Apostolic Vicariate of Awasa, Ethiopia
 Apostolic Vicariate of Benghazi, Libya
 Apostolic Vicariate of Derna, Libya
 Apostolic Vicariate of Donkorkrom, Ghana
 Apostolic Vicariate of Harar, Ethiopia
 Apostolic Vicariate of Hosanna, Ethiopia
 Apostolic Vicariate of Ingwavuma, South Africa
 Apostolic Vicariate of Makokou in Gabon
 Apostolic Vicariate of Meki, Ethiopia
 Apostolic Vicariate of Mongo, Chad
 Apostolic Vicariate of Nekemte, Ethiopia
 Apostolic Vicariate of Rodrigues, Mauritius
 Apostolic Vicariate of Rundu, Namibia
 Apostolic Vicariate of Soddo, Ethiopia
 Apostolic Vicariate of Tripoli, Libya

The Americas
 Apostolic Vicariate of Aguarico, Ecuador
 Apostolic Vicariate of Aysén, Chile
 Apostolic Vicariate of Camiri, Bolivia
 Apostolic Vicariate of Caroní, Venezuela
 Apostolic Vicariate of Chaco Paraguayo, Paraguay
 Apostolic Vicariate of Darién, Panama
 Apostolic Vicariate of El Beni, Bolivia
 Apostolic Vicariate of El Petén, Guatemala
 Apostolic Vicariate of Esmeraldas, Ecuador
 Apostolic Vicariate of Galapagos, Ecuador
 Apostolic Vicariate of Guapi, Colombia
 Apostolic Vicariate of Inírida, Colombia
 Apostolic Vicariate of Iquitos, Peru
 Apostolic Vicariate of Jaén in Peru/San Francisco Javier
 Apostolic Vicariate of Leticia, Colombia
 Apostolic Vicariate of Méndez, Ecuador
 Apostolic Vicariate of Mitú, Colombia
 Apostolic Vicariate of Napo, Ecuador
 Apostolic Vicariate of Ñuflo de Chávez, Bolivia
 Apostolic Vicariate of Pando, Bolivia
 Apostolic Vicariate of Pilcomayo, Paraguay
 Apostolic Vicariate of Pucallpa, Peru
 Apostolic Vicariate of Puerto Ayacucho, Venezuela
 Apostolic Vicariate of Puerto Carreño, Colombia
 Apostolic Vicariate of Puerto Gaitán, Colombia
 Apostolic Vicariate of Puerto Leguízamo-Solano, Colombia
 Apostolic Vicariate of Puerto Maldonado, Peru
 Apostolic Vicariate of Puyo, Ecuador
 Apostolic Vicariate of Requena, Peru
 Apostolic Vicariate of Reyes, Bolivia
 Apostolic Vicariate of San Andrés y Providencia, Colombia
 Apostolic Vicariate of San José de Amazonas, Peru
 Apostolic Vicariate of San Miguel de Sucumbíos, Ecuador
 Apostolic Vicariate of San Ramon, Peru
 Apostolic Vicariate of Tierradentro, Colombia
 Apostolic Vicariate of Trinidad, Colombia
 Apostolic Vicariate of Tucupita, Venezuela
 Apostolic Vicariate of Yurimaguas, Peru
 Apostolic Vicariate of Zamora, Ecuador

Asia
 Apostolic Vicariate of Aleppo, Syria
 Apostolic Vicariate of Anatolia, Turkey
 Apostolic Vicariate of Beirut, Lebanon
 Apostolic Vicariate of Bontoc-Lagawe, Philippines
 Apostolic Vicariate of Brunei Darussalam, Brunei
 Apostolic Vicariate of Calapan, Philippines
 Apostolic Vicariate of Jolo, Philippines
 Apostolic Vicariate of Luang Prabang, Laos
 Apostolic Vicariate of Nepal, Nepal
 Apostolic Vicariate of Northern Arabia, Kuwait, Qatar, Bahrain & Saudi Arabia
 Apostolic Vicariate of Paksé, Laos
 Apostolic Vicariate of Phnom Penh, Cambodia
 Apostolic Vicariate of Puerto Princesa, Philippines
 Apostolic Vicariate of Quetta, Pakistan
 Apostolic Vicariate of San Jose in Mindoro, Philippines
 Apostolic Vicariate of Savannakhet, Laos
 Apostolic Vicariate of Southern Arabia, Oman, United Arab Emirates & Yemen
 Apostolic Vicariate of Tabuk, Philippines
 Apostolic Vicariate of Taytay, Philippines
 Apostolic Vicariate of Vientiane, Laos

Europe
 Apostolic Vicariate of Thessaloniki, Greece
 Apostolic Vicariate of Istanbul, Turkey

Historical apostolic vicariates
(incomplete)
Inactive apostolic vicariates (and/or former names, often promoted to diocese) are in italics.
Eastern Catholic (mostly Byzantine Rite) apostolic vicariates are in bold.

Africa
 Apostolic Vicariate of Bomadi, Nigeria
 Apostolic Vicariate of the Congo
 Apostolic Vicariate of Dahomey
 Apostolic Vicariate of French Congo, or Lower Congo
 Apostolic Vicariate of Francistown, Botswana
 Apostolic Vicariate of Isiolo, Kenya
 Apostolic Vicariate of Kamerun, Cameroon
 Apostolic Vicariate of Kenia, Kenya
 Apostolic Vicariate of Kimberley in Orange, South Africa
 Apostolic Vicariate of Kontagora, Nigeria
 Apostolic Vicariate of Mauritius
 Apostolic Vicariate of Northern Victoria Nyanza
 Apostolic Vicariate of Sahara
 Apostolic Vicariate of Senegambia
 Apostolic Vicariate of Shire
 Apostolic Vicariate of Sudan or Central-Africa
 Apostolic Vicariate of Unyanyembe

The Americas
 Apostolic Vicariate of Alaska
 Apostolic Vicariate of San José de Amazonas
 Apostolic Vicariate of Athabasca
 Apostolic Vicariate of Beni
 Apostolic Vicariate of Bluefields, Nicaragua
 Apostolic Vicariate of Casanare
 Apostolic Vicariate of Dakota Territory
 Apostolic Vicariate of Goajira
 Apostolic Vicariate of Izabal, Guatemala
 Apostolic Vicariate of Keewatin
 Apostolic Vicariate of Limón, Costa Rica
 Apostolic Vicariate of Lower California
 Apostolic Vicariate of Machiques, Venezuela
 Apostolic Vicariate of Marysville
 Apostolic Vicariate of Mackenzie
 Apostolic Vicariate of Montevideo, Uruguay (erected 1830, promoted to Diocese 1878)
 Apostolic Vicariate of Nebraska, United States
 Apostolic Vicariate of Northern Minnesota
 Apostolic Vicariate of Riohacha, Colombia
 Apostolic Vicariate of San Gabriel de la Dolorosa del Maranon (renamed Yurimaguas), Peru
 Apostolic Vicariate of San José del Guaviare, Colombia
 Apostolic Vicariate of San Vicente del Caguán, Colombia
 Apostolic Vicariate of Iles Saint-Pierre et Miquelon, Saint-Pierre et Miquelon, in 2018 merged to Diocese of La Rochelle and Sainte
 Apostolic Vicariate of Sucumbíos
 Apostolic Vicariate of Ucayali, Peru (was suppressed in 1956 by erection of three new vicariates)

Asia
 Apostolic Vicariate of Amoy
 Apostolic Vicariate of Batavia, Indonesia
 Apostolic Vicariate of Changanacherry, India
 Apostolic Vicariate of Ernakulam
 Apostolic Vicariate of Kiang-nan, China
 Apostolic Vicariate of Korea
 Apostolic Vicariate of Kottayam
Apostolic Vicariate of Lhassa
 Apostolic Vicariate of Madras, India
 Apostolic Vicariate of Northern Kan-Su, China
 Apostolic Vicariate of Northern Shan-Si, China
 Apostolic Vicariate of Northern Shantung, China
 Apostolic Vicariate of Patna, India
 Apostolic Vicariate of Southern Shan-Si, China
 Apostolic Vicariate of Southern Shan-Tung, China
 Apostolic Vicariate of Southern Shen-Si, China
 Apostolic Vicariate of Tibet
 Apostolic Vicariate of Trichur, India

Europe
 Apostolic Vicariate of Bosnia, former Ottoman Empire
 Bulgarian Catholic Apostolic Vicariate of Constantinople, former Ottoman Empire
 Apostolic Vicariate of Gibraltar
 Apostolic Vicariate of Herzegovina, former Ottoman Empire
 Bulgarian Catholic Apostolic Vicariate of Macedonia, former Ottoman Empire
 Apostolic Vicariate of Marča, Croatia
 Apostolic Vicariate of Northern Germany
 Apostolic Vicariate of England
 Apostolic Vicariate of Scotland Bulgarian Catholic Apostolic Vicariate of Thrace, former Ottoman Empire

Oceania
 Apostolic Vicariate of Alexishafen Apostolic Vicariate of Central Oceania Apostolic Vicariate of Fiji Apostolic Vicariate of the Gilbert Islands Apostolic Vicariate of Marquesas Islands Apostolic Vicariate of New Pomerania Apostolic Vicariate of Oriental Oceania Apostolic Vicariate of Sandwich Islands Apostolic Vicariate of Tahiti Apostolic Vicariate of Western Oceania''

See also 

 List of Catholic dioceses (alphabetical)
 List of Catholic dioceses (structured view)
 List of Catholic archdioceses
 List of Catholic military ordinariates/dioceses
 List of Catholic apostolic administrations
 List of Catholic exarchates
 List of Catholic apostolic prefectures
 List of Catholic territorial prelatures
 List of Catholic missions sui juris

References

External links 

 List of current Apostolic Vicariates at GCatholic.org (regularly refreshed)